This is a '''list of beaches in Mexico.

 Acapulco, Guerrero
 Cabo San Lucas, Baja California Sur
 Cancún, Quintana Roo
 Cozumel, Quintana Roo
 Ensenada, Baja California
 Huatulco, Oaxaca
 Ixtapa, Guerrero
 Manzanillo, Colima
 Mazatlán, Sinaloa
 Nuevo Vallarta, Nayarit
 Playa del Carmen, Quintana Roo
 Puerto Escondido, Oaxaca
 Puerto Peñasco, Sonora
 Puerto Vallarta, Jalisco
 Punta Maroma, Quintana Roo

Beaches in Tijuana

 Playa Tijuana
 Playami Beach
 Monumental
 Costa

See also
 List of beaches

References

Mexico
Beaches

Beaches